Operation Mincemeat is a musical comedy with book, music and lyrics by comedy theatre troupe SplitLip (consisting of David Cumming, Felix Hagan, Natasha Hodgson and Zoe Roberts). The plot is based on the Operation Mincemeat, a Second World War British deception operation.

Production history 
An early version of the show was first performed in 2019. Since then it has been staged in several London theatres: New Diorama Theatre (2019), Southwark Playhouse (2020, 2021, 2022) and Riverside Studios (2022).

The musical will transfer to London's West End for a limited run at the Fortune Theatre beginning previews on 29 March 2023 (with press nights on 9 and 10 May) until 8 July 2023.

Characters and cast

Over a dozen characters are played by the 5 members of cast, often gender-swapped.

Critical reception

The show received positive reviews and has been compared to the Broadway musical Hamilton. It was nominated for several awards and listed in the Observer's Top 10 shows of the year.

David Benedict, in his review of the Southwark Playhouse production of the show for Variety, wrote, "this is the musical you didn’t know you needed — until you see the expert cast of five embracing and racing through a clutch of preposterous yet endearing characters and musical styles, telling a story with delicious precision".

Reviewing the Riverside Studios production in Gay Times, Chris Selman wrote "the songs are brilliant, the script is smart, the jokes are hilarious; more than that, though, this ingenious production manages to create an entire world and substantial cast on a shoestring budget with a tiny ensemble".

Awards and nominations

External links 

 Official website

References 

2017 musicals
Musicals about World War II
Operation Mincemeat
West End musicals